There were two special elections to the United States House of Representatives in 1987 during the 100th United States Congress.

List of elections 

Elections are listed by date and district.

|-
! 
| Sala Burton
|  | Democratic
| 1983 (Special)
|  | Incumbent died February 1, 1987.A special election was held April 7, 1987, but no candidate received the required majority.New member won a special run-off election June 2, 1987.Democratic hold.
| nowrap | 

|-
! 
| Stewart McKinney
|  | Republican
| 1970
|  | Incumbent died May 7, 1987.New member elected August 18, 1987.Republican hold.
| nowrap | 

|}

See also 
 List of special elections to the United States House of Representatives
 100th United States Congress

References 

 
1987